JLab Audio is an American consumer audio brand founded in 2005. The company began by making value priced in-ear headphones, but has since expanded to include premium in-ear and over-ear headphones, as well as wireless headphones and Bluetooth speakers.

History
JLab was founded by Joshua Rosenfield in 2005 in Tucson, Arizona, where they operated until 2012 when they relocated to Oceanside, California. This occurred after the company was purchased in January by a Dallas, Texas-based private equity group and leadership transitioned to current CEO, Winthrop Cramer. Winthrop lead the Company to a top 5 headphone brand in the US market and initiated a global sales plan to further accelerate growth. Winthrop was named EY Entrepreneur of the Year in 2019, a top 40 under 40 in CE by Dealerscope.

After growing more than 250 percent from 2015 to 2017, JLab moved into a new facility in Carlsbad, California to support its growth. JLab became the official audio partner of Major League Soccer in 2017.

It was purchased in 2021 by Noritsu.

JLab has made the INC 5000 list five times between 2010 and 2020 and two INC 5000 California regional awards as No. 131 each year (2020 and 2021).

News
During the COVID-19 pandemic, JLab donated 3,000 headphones in its home county of San Diego to help distance learning. "At a time when many students are lacking the equipment necessary to successfully participate in distance learning while at home during the COVID-19 pandemic, local company JLab Audio has answered the need and donated 3,000 pairs of its neon on-air headphones to San Diego County students," according to the San Diego county office of education. The company went on the donate more than 22,000 headphones for remote learning to other communities including Los Angeles through their LA Galaxy partnership, Atlanta United, and New York.

JLab became the No. 3 most innovative companies in Fast Company's consumer electronics sector for "for building a virtual fitting room for its best-selling, under-$100 wireless earbuds."

References

Loudspeaker manufacturers
Headphones manufacturers
Electronics companies established in 2005
2005 establishments in Arizona
American brands
Audio equipment manufacturers of the United States